The Home Mission Cemetery is a historic cemetery located on West Dove Wing Way in the Maricopa County of Arizona, which is slightly outside of the Surprise town border. The cemetery is also known as the "Sleeping Bride Cemetery" and the "Thompson Cemetery". The Pioneers' Cemetery Association (PCA) defines a "historic cemetery" as one which has been in existence for more than fifty years.

History
Lewis and his wife Marie Thompson were homesteaders who settled down in the area which is now part of the town of Surprise. In 1936, Marie established a small cemetery in one acre of the Thompson family ranch. The Thompson's would regularly hold Bible studies in their ranch house. In 1936, their son, 15 year-old Robert Thompson and his friend were playing with a gun when suddenly it accidentally went off and fatally shot him. Thus, he became the first person to be buried in the cemetery.

In the 1950s the property, which included the cemetery, was passed on to Reverent James Outlaw, a Pentecostal preacher and his religious Mission. The members of the Mission were the ones who called the cemetery the "Sleeping Bride Cemetery". This was within the believe that Christians are brides of Christ.

Thirty-seven graves have been identified so far. The most common surnames in the cemetery are those of the Thompson's and Rhodes'. The Surprise Historical Society is in process of restoring, preserving and maintaining the cemetery as a Pioneer Cemetery.

Graves

See also

 Adamsville A.O.U.W. Cemetery
 City of Mesa Cemetery
 Pioneer and Military Memorial Park
 Glendale Memorial Park Cemetery
 Double Butte Cemetery
 Greenwood/Memory Lawn Mortuary & Cemetery
 Goodyear Farms Historic Cemetery
 St. Francis Catholic Cemetery
 Historic Pinal Cemetery

References

External links
 

Cemeteries in Arizona
Buildings and structures in Maricopa County, Arizona